Zamper is an original novel written by Gareth Roberts and based on the long-running British science fiction television series Doctor Who. It features the Seventh Doctor, Bernice, Chris and Roz.

Synopsis
The Doctor and his companions, separated from the TARDIS, investigate Zamper.  It is an organization dedicated to building gigantic warships. A separate race has arrived in order to commission craft; also industrial accidents are plaguing the workers.

1995 British novels
1995 science fiction novels
Virgin New Adventures
Novels by Gareth Roberts (writer)
Seventh Doctor novels
Fiction set in the 6th millennium